Nora Conway (c. 1920 - c. 2010) was an Irish badminton player.

Biography
Nora Conway first won the national title in Ireland in 1948. Four more titles followed until 1952. In 1948 and 1950 she won the Irish Open.

Achievements

References

1920s births
2010s deaths
Irish female badminton players